David Ioane Vaealiki (born 13 November 1980) is a New Zealand former rugby league and rugby union footballer who most recently played for SC Albi.

Early years and Parramatta
A product of New Zealand junior side Sydenham, David Vaealiki attended Linwood High School and became Canterbury's youngest ever representative when he made his début for the province aged just 17 years and 199 days in a match against the West Coast. He then signed for the Parramatta Eels and made his first grade début in 1999. During this time he taught Physical Education at Castle Hill High School, where the league team he coached had 0 wins. He went on to play for Parramatta at centre in their 2001 NRL Grand Final loss to the Newcastle Knights. Vaealiki scored the fastest hat-trick in the NRL versus Penrith 17 March 2002. In 2004, David's season was cut short by an Achilles tendon injury, he played only eight games.

Wigan Warriors career
He signed a 3-year contract with the Wigan Warriors in July 2004. He joined the club for the 2005 Super League and his first appearance for Wigan Warriors on 30 January 2005 in a pre-season friendly against the London Broncos after starting the match from the bench. He made his first start for the Wigan Warriors in their 15–4 win over the Salford City Reds in the Super League his last game was the semi-final versus Leeds Rhinos during October 2007.

Manly-Warringah Sea Eagles
David Vaealiki was expected to join the Harlequins RL when his Wigan Warriors contract expired at the end of 2007's Super League XII and it was not known if he was offered a new contract. During September 2007 he was linked with a move to French rugby union side Sporting Club Albigeois.

Instead Vaealiki joined the Manly-Warringah Sea Eagles on a one-year deal and played two games for the club in early 2008.

French rugby union
Vaealiki was released by Manly after round 7 of the NRL to enable him to take up the offer of a two-year contract with Top 14 French rugby union club, SC Albi.

International career
Vaealiki earned international selection for the Junior Kiwis in 1998 and played for New Zealand between 2000 and 2003, including the World Cup in 2000.

References

External links
 David Vaealiki Wigan Career Page on the Wigan RL Fansite.
Wigan Warriors Profile
Super League Profile

1980 births
Living people
Canterbury rugby league team players
Expatriate rugby union players in France
Manly Warringah Sea Eagles players
New Zealand expatriate sportspeople in France
New Zealand expatriate rugby union players
New Zealand rugby league players
New Zealand rugby union players
New Zealand sportspeople of Tongan descent
New Zealand national rugby league team players
Parramatta Eels players
Junior Kiwis players
Rugby league centres
Rugby league players from Christchurch
Rugby union players from Christchurch
Sydenham Swans players
Wigan Warriors players